Stage Mother is a 2020 Canadian comedy-drama film directed by Thom Fitzgerald, from a screenplay by Brad Hennig. The film stars Jacki Weaver, Lucy Liu, Adrian Grenier, Mya Taylor, Allister MacDonald, Oscar Moreno and Jackie Beat.

Stage Mother had its world premiere at the Palm Springs International Film Festival on January 4, 2020 and was released in the United States on August 21, 2020 by Momentum Pictures.

Premise
The story follows a conservative church choir director who inherits a drag club in San Francisco started by her deceased son, from whom she was estranged after he came out as gay.

Cast
 Jacki Weaver as Maybelline Metcalf
 Sofia Banzhaf as young Maybelline Metcalf
 Lucy Liu as Sienna
 Adrian Grenier as Nathan  
 Mya Taylor as Cherry Poppins
 Allister MacDonald as Joan of Arkansas
 Oscar Moreno as Tequila Mockingbird
 Jackie Beat as Dusty Muffin 
 Lenore Zann as Bevette
 Anthony Skordi as August
 Hugh Thompson as Jeb Metcalf
 Eldon Thiele as Ricky Metcalf
 Callum Dunphy as Chappy

Production
In May 2018, it was announced that Jacki Weaver, Lucy Liu, and Taye Diggs had signed on to appear in the film, with filming set to take place in Nova Scotia, Canada. However, Diggs had to drop out of the production due to scheduling conflicts. Filming took place in late 2018.

Release
The film had its world premiere at the Palm Springs International Film Festival on January 4, 2020. Shortly after, Momentum Pictures acquired distribution rights to the film, and set it for an August 21, 2020, release.

References

External links

2020 films
2020 LGBT-related films
2020 comedy-drama films
Canadian comedy-drama films
Canadian LGBT-related films
Drag (clothing)-related films
Films set in San Francisco
Films set in Texas
LGBT-related comedy-drama films
English-language Canadian films
Films directed by Thom Fitzgerald
Films shot in Halifax, Nova Scotia
2020s English-language films
2020s Canadian films